Moyobamba District is one of six districts of the province Moyobamba in Peru.

References